Paysbuy is a payment processor and one of Thailand's three major payment service providers. It is a subsidiary of DTAC.

Paysbuy is licensed by the Bank of Thailand to operate an e-money business and is accredited with Trustmark (DBD Verified) by the Department of Business Development, Ministry of Commerce.

History
Paysbuy was founded in 2004 by Aung Kyaw Moe and Suchote Cheewakoseth.

In 2008, DTAC acquired the majority stake in the company. Paysbuy was the first e-wallet service in Thailand and was acquired by Omise in 2017.

See also
 PayPal
 DTAC
 True Money

References

External links
 

Companies based in Bangkok
Online payments
Financial services companies of Thailand